Arthur Palethorpe (1854 – 23 July 1916) was a New Zealand cricketer who played for Wellington. Palethorpe made a single first-class appearance for the side, during the 1879–80 season, against Nelson. From the tailend, he failed to score a run in either innings in which he batted.

References

External links
Arthur Palethorpe at Cricket Archive 

1854 births
1916 deaths
New Zealand cricketers
Wellington cricketers